Óscar Yebra Fernández (born 15 July 1974 in León) is a Spanish former professional basketball player.

He represented the Spanish national team at the 2004 Summer Olympics. As of March 2020, he is coaching in China.

References

External links
 ACB profile
 
 

1974 births
Living people
Baloncesto León players
Basketball players at the 2004 Summer Olympics
CB Valladolid players
Gijón Baloncesto players
Liga ACB players
Limoges CSP players
Mahram Tehran BC players
Melilla Baloncesto players
Olympic basketball players of Spain
Spanish expatriate basketball people in France
Spanish expatriate basketball people in Iran
Spanish men's basketball players
Valencia Basket players
Small forwards
Sportspeople from León, Spain